Roland Hayes Lakes (December 25, 1939 – March 5, 2012) was an American football defensive lineman.  He played defensive tackle at University of Wichita, and then for eleven seasons in the National Football League (NFL) (San Francisco 49ers 1961–1970, and New York Giants 1971).

References 

1939 births
2012 deaths
Sportspeople from Vicksburg, Mississippi
Players of American football from Mississippi
American football defensive linemen
San Francisco 49ers players
New York Giants players
Wichita State Shockers football players